The Skegness Clay is a geologic formation in England. It preserves fossils dating back to the Cretaceous period.

See also

 List of fossiliferous stratigraphic units in England

References
 

Geologic formations of England
Lower Cretaceous Series of Europe
Cretaceous England
Aptian Stage
Shale formations